Chang Fee Ming (born 1959) is a Malaysian artist who works in watercolour, painting idyllic rural scenes. Chang is one of the most successful and highly regarded contemporary watercolourist in Southeast Asia. A self-taught artist, he began his career in the early 1980s.

He started his international travels in the early 1980s — to Nepal, India, Indochina.

He is currently in Singapore (May 2016) to hold an exhibition called "A Traveller's Diary".

Book 
The World Of Chang Fee Ming (1995)
The Visible Trail of Chang Fee Ming (2000)
Mekong (2004)
Mekong Exploring the Source (2008)
Imprinted Thoughts (2009) 
Sketching Through Southeast Asia (2010)
Visage (2010)

References

External links
 

Living people
1959 births
People from Terengganu
Malaysian people of Chinese descent
Malaysian artists
Malaysian painters